(1577 – December 1, 1602) was the fifth son of Kinoshita Iesada and a nephew of Toyotomi Hideyoshi. He was gained the rank of Saemon no Kami (左衛門督) or in China Shikkingo (執金吾) at genpuku and held the court title of Chūnagon (中納言), Hideaki was also called Kingo Chūnagon (金吾中納言).

Biography

He was adopted by Hideyoshi and called himself Hashiba Hidetoshi (羽柴 秀俊). He was then again adopted by Kobayakawa Takakage, becoming Kobayakawa Hidetoshi (小早川 秀俊). He then renamed himself Hideaki (秀秋) after Takakage's death. Shortly after the Battle of Sekigahara, he renamed one last time to Kobayakawa Hideaki (小早川 秀詮).

During the Battle of Keicho he led reinforcements to rescue Ulsan Castle from the Ming army. Fighting on the front line with a spear, he managed to capture an enemy commander and broke the siege. However, Hideyoshi saw the danger of a reckless charge by the general commanding an army and deprived him of his domain, Chikugo after returning. Kobayakawa, angered by this, he believed the rumor circulated by Tokugawa Ieyasu that this had been the doing of a jealous Ishida Mitsunari. He never forgot nor forgave Mitsunari and worked to undermine his position. Moreover, Kobayakawa was known to attack women and children during the campaign, an act that was despised by many of his fellow commanders.

Battle of Sekigahara

Before the battle of Sekigahara, Kobayakawa happened to be in Osaka and gave aid to Mitsunari in the Siege of Fushimi. He acted as though he would go along with Mitsunari, even though he intended to betray him, having secretly communicated with Ieyasu. Knowing Kobayakawa held ill feelings, Mitsunari and Ōtani Yoshitsugu promised him two additional domains around Osaka and the position of kampaku (until Toyotomi Hideyori grew old enough to rule) if he helped them to victory.

Even after the battle began, Kobayakawa kept his intentions hidden. Ieyasu's force (east) was not faring well against Mitsunari's force (west); Ukita Hideie was winning against Fukushima Masanori and Ōtani Yoshitsugu was also winning against Tōdō Takatora.  Kobayakawa was hesitant to participate with either side.  Ieyasu ordered troops to fire blanks against the Kobayakawa troops to force them into action. Kobayakawa then ordered an attack on the Otani troop and while this attack was beaten back temporarily, his action forced the other armies who had pledged betrayal to also turn.  The battle was over within a day.

Kobayakawa also had success in the mopping up operations that followed, defeating Mitsunari's father, Ishida Masatsugu in the Siege of Sawayama.

Death

Once the dust had settled, Kobayakawa was given the defeated Ukita clan's former fiefdoms of Bizen and Mimasaka, for a total of 550,000 koku.  However, Kobayakawa drank himself to death two years later after supposedly going mad, and with no one to succeed him, the Kobayakawa clan disbanded, and his fiefdoms were absorbed by the neighboring Ikeda clan.

External links

samurai-archives.com - page on Kobayakawa Hideaki; contains information on the Battle of Sekigahara as well
City of Okayama

1577 births
1602 deaths
Kobayakawa clan
Toyotomi clan
Daimyo
People of the Japanese invasions of Korea (1592–1598)
People from Okayama Prefecture